Ibrahim Labaan Shareef (born 18 January 1996) is a Maldivian professional footballer who plays as a goalkeeper. He currently plays for Club Valencia. Labaan made his debut in the Dhivehi Premier League on 25 May 2013.

International career
Labaan has played several competitions like AFC U-21 Qualifying for the Maldives, and has played for Maldives national under-17 football team. He played four matches in AFC U-19 Qualifications held In Amman, Jordan, and got Man Of The Match against Afghanistan.

References

External links
 
 
 gettyimages.com
 afcasiancup.com
 

1996 births
Living people
Maldivian footballers
New Radiant S.C. players
Club Valencia players
Association football goalkeepers
Footballers at the 2014 Asian Games
Asian Games competitors for the Maldives